This is a list of the Acts of the Jatiya Sangsad, the National Parliament of Bangladesh.

1973 
 Ministers, Ministers of State and Deputy Ministers (Remuneration and Privileges) Act, 1973 (No 4)
 Insurance Corporation Act, 1973 (No 6) [Repealed]. See further Sadharan Bima Corporation and Jiban Bima Corporation.
 Appropriation (Vote on Account) Act, 1973 (No 7)
 Bangladesh Laws (Revision and Declaration) Act, 1973 (No 8)
 Bangladesh Rice Research Institute Act, 1973 (No 10) [Repealed]
 Finance Act, 1973 (No 11)
 Appropriation (Railways) Act, 1973 (No 12)
 Appropriation Act, 1973 (No 16)
 International Crimes (Tribunals) Act, 1973 (No 19)
 Bangladesh Fisheries Development Corporation Act, 1973 (No 22)
 Printing Presses and Publications (Declaration and Registration) Act, 1973 (No 23)
 Rajshahi University Act, 1973 (No 26)
 Bangladesh Girl Guides Association Act, 1973 (No 31). Sometimes called the Girls Guide Act.
 Chittagong University Act, 1973 (No 33)
 Jahangirnagar University Act, 1973 (No 34)

1974 
 Special Police Establishment (Repeal) Act, 1974 (No 2)
 Transfer of Railways (Repeal) Act, 1974 (No 4)
 Primary Schools (Taking Over) Act, 1974 (No 8)
 Bidi (Restriction of Manufacture) (Repeal) Act, 1974 (No 9)
 Public Servants (Retirement) Act, 1974 (No 12) [Repealed]
 Bangladesh Jute Research Institute Act, 1974 (No 13) [Repealed]
 Special Powers Act, 1974 (No 14)
 Refugees Rehabilitation Finance Corporation (Repeal) Act, 1974 (No 16)
 Bangladesh Wild Life (Preservation) (Amendment) Act, 1974 (No 17)
 Bangladesh Unnayan Gobeshona Protishthan Act, 1974 (No 19), formerly called the Bangladesh Institute of Development Studies Act, 1974 [Repealed]
 Members of the Bangladesh Public Service Commission (Terms and Conditions of Service) Act, 1974 (No 21)
 Comptroller and Auditor-General (Additional Functions) Act, 1974 (No 24)
 Press Council Act, 1974 (No 25)
 Territorial Waters and Maritime Zones Act, 1974 (No 26)
 Essential Services Laws (Amendment) Act, 1974 (No 36)
 Children Act, 1974 (No 39) [Repealed]
 Appropriation (Supplementary) Act, 1974 (No 42)
 Appropriation (Vote on Account) Act, 1974 (No 43)
 Finance Act, 1974 (No 44)
 Speaker and Deputy Speaker (Remuneration and Privileges) Act, 1974 (No 48)
 Appropriation Act, 1974 (No 50)
 Muslim Marriages and Divorces (Registration) Act, 1974 (No 52)
 Primary Education Laws (Repeal) Act, 1974 (No 55)
 National Sports Council Act, 1974 (No 57) [Repealed]
 Extradition Act, 1974 (No 58)
 Bangladesh Petroleum Act, 1974 (No 69)
 Oil and Gas Development Corporation (Repeal) Act, 1974 (No 70)
 Stamp Duties (Additional Modes of Payment) Act, 1974 (No 71)
 Record of Jute Growers (Border Areas) Act, 1974 (No 76)

1975 
 Finance Act, 1975 (No 3)
 Appropriation (Supplementary) Act, 1975 (No 4)
 Appropriation (Vote on Account) Act, 1975 (No 5)
 President's (Remuneration and Privileges) Act, 1975 (No 7)
 Prime Minister's (Remuneration and Privileges) Act, 1975 (No 9)
 Bangladesh Laws (Amendment) Act, 1975 (No 13)
 Bangladesh (Restoration of Evacuee Property) (Effect of Expiry) Act, 1975 (No 15)
 ESSO Undertaking Acquisition Act, 1975 (No 16)
 Islamic Foundation Act, 1975 (No 17)
 Blind Relief (Donation of Eye) Act, 1975 (No 25)
 Islamic Development Bank Act, 1975 (No 28)
 Services (Reorganisation and Conditions) Act, 1975 (No 32) [Repealed]
 Nationalised Banks (Transfer of Business) Act, 1975 (No 34)
 Hundred-Taka Demonetised Notes (Mode of Payment and Recovery of Taxes) Act, 1975 (No 35)
 Government-owned Newspapers (Management) Act, 1975 (No 41)
 Appropriation Act, 1975 (No 44)

1980 
 University Laws Amendment Act, 1980 (No 1)
 Banks and Financial Institutions Laws Amendment Act, 1980 (No 9)
 Foreign Private Investment (Promotion and Protection) Act, 1980 (No 11)
 Note-Books (Prohibition) Act, 1980 (No 12)
 Ombudsman Act, 1980 (No 15)
 Medical and Dental Council Act, 1980 (No 16) [Repealed]
 Appropriation (Railways Supplementary) Act, 1980 (No 20)
 Appropriation (Railways) Act, 1980 (No 21)
 Appropriation (Supplementary) Act, 1980 (No 22)
 Finance Act, 1980 (No 23)
 Appropriation Act, 1980 (No 24)
 Film Clubs (Registration and Regulation) Act, 1980 (No 28) [Repealed]
 Dowry Prohibition Act, 1980 (No 35) [Repealed]
 Bangladesh Export Processing Zones Authority Act, 1980 (No 36)
 Islamic University Act, 1980 (No 37)
 Public Examinations (Offences) Act, 1980 (No 42)

1981 
 Members of Parliament (Determination of Dispute) Act, 1980 (No 1 of 1981), passed on 27 January 1981
 Bangladesh Consumer Supplies Corporation (Repeal) Act, 1981 (No 3)
 Administrative Tribunal Act, 1980 (No 7 of 1981)
 Appropriation (Railways Supplementary) Act, 1981 (No 8)
 Appropriation (Railways) Act, 1981 (No 9)
 Appropriation (Supplementary) Act, 1981 (No 10)
 Finance Act, 1981 (No 11)
 Appropriation Act, 1981 (No 12)

1987 
 Specification (Supplementary) Act, 1987
 Specification (Advance Granting) Act, 1987
 Port of Chalna Authority (Amendment) Act, 1987 (No 1)
 Bengali Language Introduction Act, 1987 (No 2)
 Members of Parliament (Salaries and Allowances) (Amendment) Act, 1987 (No 4) or the Members' of Parliament (Remuneration and Privileges) (Amendment) Act, 1987
 Leader and Deputy Leader of the Opposition (Remuneration and Privileges) (Amendment) Act, 1987 (No 5)
 Speaker and Deputy Speaker (Remuneration and Privileges) (Amendment) Act, 1987 (No 7)
 Vice-Prime Minister's Remuneration and Special Powers Act, 1987 (No 8)
 Building Construction (Amendment) Act, 1987 (No 12)
 Criminal Law Amendment (Amendment) Act, 1987 (No 13)
 Civil Courts (Amendment) Act, 1987 (No 14)
 Shilet Shahjalal Scientific and Technological University Act, 1987 (No 15) or the Shahjalal University of Science and Technology Act, 1987
 Special Powers (Amendment) Act, 1987 (No 17)
 Bangladesh Shilpa Bank (Amendment) Act, 1987 (No 18)
 Bangladesh Shilpa Rin Sangstha (Amendment) Act, 1987 (No 19)
 Explosives (Amendment) Act, 1987 (No 20)
 Explosive Substances (Amendment) Act, 1987 (No 21)
 Local Government (Upazila Parishad and Upazila Administration Reorganisation) (Amendment) Act, 1987 (No 22)
 Local Government Laws (Amendment) Act, 1987 (No 23)
 Bangladesh Industrial Enterprises (Nationalisation) (Amendment) Act, 1987 (No 24)
 Finance Act, 1987 (No 27)
 Government and Autonomous Bodies Employees Benevolent Fund and Group Insurance (Amendment) Ordinance, 1987 (No 28)
 Town Improvement (Amendment) Act, 1987 (No 29)
 Administrative Tribunals (Amendment) Act, 1987 (No 30)
 Appropriation Act, 1987 (No 31)
 Bangladesh Biman Corporation (Amendment) Act, 1987 (No 32)
 Workmen's Compensation (Amendment) Act, 1987 (No 33)
 Presidential Election (Amendment) Act, 1987 (No 34)
 Public Demands Recovery (Amendment) Act, 1987 (No 35)
 University Laws (Amendment) Act, 1987 (No 36)
 Members' of Parliament (Salaries and Allowances) (Second Amendment) Act, 1987 (No 37)
 Rajshahi City Corporation Act, 1987 (No 38) [Repealed]

1988 
 Relief and Rehabilitation Surcharge Act, 1988
 Movable Property Possession Act, 1988
 Specification (Supplementary) Act, 1988
 Specification (Advance Granting) Act, 1988
 Finance Act, 1988
 Specification Act, 1988

1989 
 Specification (Advance Granting) Act, 1988
 Finance Act, 1988
 Specification Act, 1988
 Brick Burning (Control) Act, 1989 [Repealed]
 Iodine Deficiency Disease Prevention Act, 1989 [Repealed]
 Ordnance Factory Board (Repair) Act, 1989
 Bangladesh Debt Arbitration Act, 1989
 Hill Districts (Repeal and Enforcement and Special Provisions) Act, 1989
 Board of Investment Act, 1989 [Repealed]
 Rangamati Hill District Council Act, 1989
 Khagrachhari Hill District Council Act, 1989
 Bandarban Hill District Council Act, 1989
 Bangladesh Shilpakala Academy Act, 1989
 Land Reform Board Act, 1989
 Land Appeal Board Act, 1989
 Specification (Supplementary) Act, 1989
 Specification (Advance Granting) Act, 1989
 Finance Act, 1989
 Specification Act, 1989

1990 
 Bangladesh Computer Council Act, 1990
 Bogra Rural Development Academy Act, 1990
 Drug Control Act, 1990 [Repealed]
 Industrial Development (Regulation and Regulation) (Repel) Act, 1990
 Primary Education (Compulsory) Act, 1990
 Private Educational Institutions Teachers and Employees Welfare Trust Act, 1990
 Dhaka Electricity Distribution Authority Act, 1990
 Specification (Supplementary) Act, 1990
 Specification (Advance Granting) Act, 1990
 Donor Act, 1990
 Finance Act, 1990
 River Research Institute Act, 1990
 Khulna University Act, 1990
 Specification Act, 1990

1991 
 House Rent Control Act, 1991
 National Women's Organization Act, 1991
 Election Officer (Special Provisions) Act, 1991
 Banking-Company Act, 1991
 Specification (Supplementary) Act, 1991
 Specification (Advance Granting) Act, 1991
 Finance Act, 1991
 Value Added Tax Act, 1991 [Repealed]
 Referendum Act, 1991
 Specification (Advance Granting) Act, 1991
 Presidential Election Act, 1991
 Bangladesh Space Research and Remote Sensing Institutions Act, 1991

1992 
 Private University Act, 1992 [Repealed]
 National University Act, 1992
 Bangladesh Open University Act, 1992
 Mines and Mineral Resources (Control and Development) Act, 1992
 Bangladesh Trade and Tariff Commission Act, 1992
 Inland Naval Workers (Employment-Control) Act, 1992
 Shrimp Farming Act, 1992
 Local Government (Reorganization of Upazila Parishad and Upazila Administration) Act, 1992
 Water Resources Planning Act, 1992
 Specification (Supplementary) Act, 1992
 Specification (Advance Granting) Act, 1992
 Finance Act, 1992
 Rajshahi Metropolitan Police Act, 1992
 Specification Act, 1992
 National Local Government Institute Act, 1992

1993 
 Bangladesh Securities and Exchange Commission Act, 1993
 Specification (Supplementary) Act, 1993
 Finance Act, 1993
 Specification Act, 1993
 Nuclear Safety and Radiation Control Act, 1993 [Repealed]
 Bangladesh Jute Corporation (Repellent) Act, 1993
 Financial Institutions Act, 1993

1994 
 Conventional Law and Legal Documents (Adaptation) Act, 1994
 National Parliament Secretariat Act, 1994
 Scheduled Dargah (Management and Management) Abolition Act, 1994
 Specification (Supplementary) Act, 1994
 Finance Act, 1994
 Specification Act, 1994
 Company Act, 1994
 Suppression of Terrorist Crimes (Special Provisions) Act, 1994
 Coast Guard Act, 1994 [Repealed]

1995 
 Bangladesh Environmental Protection Act, 1995
 Ansar Bahini Act, 1995
 Battalion Ansar Act, 1995
 Village Defense Team Act, 1995
 Specification (Supplementary) Act, 1995
 Finance Act, 1995
 Specification Act, 1995
 Jamuna Multipurpose Bridge Project (Land Acquisition) Act, 1995
 Judicial Administration Training Institute Act, 1995
 Ansar-VDP Development Bank Act, 1995
 National Library Act, 1995

1996 
 Combined Funds (Supplementary Grants and Specifications) Act, 1996
 Combined Funds (Advance Granting and Specification) Act, 1996
 Water Supply and Sewerage Authority Act, 1996
 Bangladesh Agricultural Research Council Act, 1996 [Repealed]
 Bangladesh Sugarcane Research Institute Act, 1996 [Repealed]
 Specification Act, 1996
 Finance Act, 1996
 Law Commission Act, 1996
 Bangladesh Private Export Processing Zones Act, 1996
 The Indemnity (Replay) Act, 1996

1997 
 Bankruptcy Act, 1997
 Bangladesh Commerce and Investment Limited (Restructuring) Act, 1997
 Specification (Supplementary) Act, 1997
 Finance Act, 1997
 Specification Act, 1997
 Anti-Aviation Security Crime Suppression Act, 1997

1998 
 Bangabandhu Sheikh Mujib Medical University Act, 1998
 Auditor General and Controller (Remuneration and Privileges) Act, 1998
 Employment Bank Act, 1998
 Bangladesh Folk and Crafts Foundation Act, 1998
 Chittagong Hill Tracts Regional Council Act, 1998
 Specification (Supplementary) Act, 1998 13
 Finance Act, 1998
 Specification Act, 1998
 Bangabandhu Sheikh Mujibur Rahman Agricultural University Act, 1998
 Upazila Parishad Act, 1998

1999 
 Human Organ Transplantation Act, 1999
 Depository Act, 1999
 Specification (Supplementary) Act, 1999
 Finance Act, 1999
 Specification Act, 1999
 Rural Poverty Alleviation Foundation Act, 1999

2000 
 Legal Aid Act, 2000
 Women and Child Abuse Suppression Act, 2000
 Environmental Court Act, 2000 [Repealed]
 Specification (Supplementary) Act, 2000
 Finance Act, 2000
 Specification Act, 2000
 Bank Deposit Insurance Act, 2000
 District Council Act, 2000
 Terms of Recruitment and Employment of Gazetted Officers (Customs, Excise and VAT) of First and Second Class outside Cadre Act, 2000
 Privatization Act, 2000 [Repealed]
 Bangladesh Water Development Board Act, 2000
 National Housing Authority Act, 2000
 Copyright Act, 2000
 Conservation Act, 2000 for playgrounds, open spaces, parks and natural reservoirs in all municipal areas of the country, including metropolitan, divisional cities and district towns.
 Private Primary Teacher Welfare Trust Act, 2000
 Admiralty Court Act, 2000

2001 
 Arbitration Act, 2001
 The Dramatic Performance (Replay) Act, 2001
 Sylhet City Corporation Act, 2001 [Repealed]
 Barisal City Corporation Act, 2001 [Repealed]
 Bangladesh Disability Welfare Act, 2001 [Repealed]
 Bangladesh Institute of Parliamentary Studies Act, 2001
 [Vested property restitution law 2001 | vested property restitution law, 2001]]
 Bangladesh Telecommunication Regulation Act, 2001
 Dhaka Vehicle Coordination Board Act, 2001 [Repealed]
 Bangladesh Land Ports Authority Act, 2001
 Specification (Supplementary) Act, 2001
 Finance Act, 2001
 Specification Act, 2001
 Bangladesh Shilpi Kalyan Trust Act, 2001
 Rangpur University of Science and Technology Act, 2001
 Haji Mohammad Danesh University of Science and Technology Act, 2001
 Bangabandhu Sheikh Mujibur Rahman University of Science and Technology Act, 2001
 Maulana Bhasani University of Science and Technology Act, 2001
 Patuakhali University of Science and Technology Act, 2001
 Rangamati University of Science and Technology Act, 2001
 Noakhali University of Science and Technology Act, 2001
 Bogra University of Science and Technology Act, 2001
 Pabna University of Science and Technology Act, 2001
 Jessore University of Science and Technology Act, 2001
 Barisal University of Science and Technology Act, 2001
 Sher-e-Bangla Agricultural University Act, 2001
 Cooperative Societies Act, 2001
 CHT Land Dispute Settlement Commission Act, 2001
 Bangladesh Betar Authority Act, 2001
 Bangladesh Television Authority Act, 2001
 Imam and Muazzin Welfare Trust Act, 2001
 Protection of family members of the father of the nation (abolish) Act, 2001

2002 
 Acid Control Act, 2002
 Acid Crime Suppression Act, 2002
 Preservation and Display of Portraits of the Father of the Nation (Abolish) Act, 2002
 Public Security (Special Provisions) (abolish) Act, 2002
 Prevention of Money Laundering Act, 2002 [Repealed]
 National Freedom Fighters Council Act, 2002
 Law and Order Disruption (Speedy Trial) Act, 2002
 Safe Blood Transfusion Act, 2002
 Specification (Supplementary) Act, 2002
 Finance Act, 2002
 Specification Act, 2002
 Institute of Child and Maternal Health Act, 2002
 Police Staff College Act, 2002
 Private Educational Institutions Teachers and Employees Retirement Benefits Act, 2002
 Speedy Trial Tribunal Act, 2002

2003 
 Joint Operations Liability Act, 2003
 Travel Tax Act, 2003
 Village Government Act, 2003 [Repealed]
 Fire Prevention and Extinguishing Act, 2003
 Money Lending Court Act, 2003
 Bangladesh Energy Regulatory Commission Act, 2003
 Specification (Supplementary) Act, 2003
 Finance Act, 2003
 Specification Act, 2003
 Bangladesh Silk Research and Training Institute Act, 2003 [Repealed]
 Chittagong University of Engineering and Technology Act, 2003
 Rajshahi University of Engineering and Technology Act, 2003
 Khulna University of Engineering and Technology Act, 2003
 Dhaka University of Engineering and Technology, Gazipur Act, 2003
 Special Courts (Additional Duties) Act, 2003

2004 
 Bangladesh Employees Welfare Board Act, 2004
 Implementation of Court Reforms (Auxiliary Provisions) Act, 2004
 Anti-Corruption Commission Act, 2004
 Bangladesh Petroleum Institute Act, 2004
 Dispute Resolution (Municipal Area) Board Act, 2004
 Specification (Supplementary) Act, 2004
 Finance Act, 2004
 Specification Act, 2004
 EPZ Trade Unions and Industrial Relations Act, 2004 [Repealed]
 Birth and Death Registration Act, 2004
 Jatiya Sangsad (Reserved Women Seats) Election Act, 2004

2005 
 Private Teacher Registration and Certification Authority Act, 2005
 Privately owned road transport workers welfare fund
 Veterinary Act, 2005
 Bangladesh Animal and Livestock Products Quarantine Act, 2005
 Smoking and Tobacco Use (Control) Act, 2005
 National Computer Training and Research Academy Act, 2005
 Specification (Supplementary) Act, 2005 15
 Finance Act, 2005

 Specification Act, 2005
 Tax-Ombudsman Act, 2005 [Repealed]
 Jagannath University Act, 2005

2006 
 Fertilizer Management Act, 2006
 Private Security Services Act, 2006
 Comilla University Act, 2006
 National Poet Kazi Nazrul Islam University Act, 2006
 Village Court Act, 2006
 Specification (Supplementary) Act, 2006
 Finance Act, 2006
 Specification (Supplementary) Act, 2006
 Public Procurement Act, 2006
 Bangladesh Workers Welfare Foundation Act, 2006
 Product Manufacturing State Industrial Estate Workers (Terms of Service) Act, 2006 [Repealed]
 Bangladesh Accreditation Act, 2006
 Chittagong Veterinary and Animal Sciences University Act, 2006
 Microcredit Regulatory Authority Act, 2006
 Chemical Weapons (Prohibition) Act, 2006
 Cable Television Network Operation Act, 2006
 Information and Communication Technology Act, 2006
 Asian University for Women Act, 2006
 Bangladesh Labor Act, 2006
 Rangpur Carmichael University Act, 2006
 Barisal University Act, 2006
 Sylhet Agricultural University Act, 2006
 Special Benefit Act for Women Convicted in Prisons Act, 2006

2009 
 Specification (Supplementary) (Fiscal Year 2006-07) Act, 2009
 Specification (Fiscal Year 2007-08) Act, 2009
 Specification (Supplementary) (Fiscal Year 2007-08) Act, 2009
 Specification (Fiscal Year 2008-09) Act, 2009
 Election Commission Secretariat Act, 2009
 Voter List Act, 2009
 Prevention of Money Laundering Act, 2009 [Repealed]
 Finance (2007-2008 Fiscal Year) Act, 2009
 Finance (2008-2009 Fiscal Year) Act, 2009
 Anti-Terrorism Act, 2009
 Trademark Act, 2009
 Right to Information Act, 2009
 Sylhet Metropolitan Police Act, 2009
 Barisal Metropolitan Police Act, 2009
 Consumer Protection Act, 2009
 Village Government (Abolish) Act, 2009
 Begum Rokeya University, Rangpur Law, 2009
 Bangladesh University of Professionals Act, 2009
 Padma Multipurpose Bridge Project (Land Acquisition) Act, 2009
 Specification (Supplementary) Act, 2009 35
 Finance Act, 2009
 Specification Act, 2009
 Government Finance and Budget Management Act, 2009
 Protection of Terrestrial Television Broadcasting Facilities for Bangladesh Television Act, 2009
 National Human Rights Commission Act, 2009
 Local Government (Municipality) Act, 2009
 Mobile Court Act, 2009
 Local Government (City Corporation) Act, 2009
 Local Government (Union Parishad) Act, 2009
 Protection of Family Members of the Father of the Nation Act, 2009

2010 
 Fisheries and Animal Feed Act, 2010
 National Identity Registration Act, 2010
 Bangabandhu Sheikh Mujibur Rahman Novo Theater Act, 2010
 Bangladesh Hi-Tech Park Authority Act, 2010
 National Museum of Science and Technology Act, 2010
 National Institute of Biotechnology Act, 2010
 Bangladesh National Scientific and Technical Documentation Center (Bansdock) Act, 2010
 Insurance Development and Regulation Authority Act, 2010
 Insurance Act, 2010
 Fisheries Hatchery Act, 2010
 Minority Cultural Institutions Act, 2010
 Chartered Secretaries Act, 2010
 Specification (Supplementary) Act, 2010
 Bangladesh Tourism Protected Areas and Special* Tourism Areas Act, 2010
 Specification Act, 2010
 Private University Act, 2010
 Bangladesh Tourism Board Act, 2010
 Bangladesh Gas Act, 2010
 Bangladesh Economic Zones Act, 2010
 EPZ Workers Welfare Association and Industrial Relations Act, 2010 [Repealed]
 Real Estate Development and Management Act, 2010
 Bangladesh Textile University Act, 2010
 Mandatory use of jute wrappers in products Act, 2010
 Rapid increase in supply of electricity and fuel (special provisions) Act, 2010
 Expatriate Welfare Bank Act, 2010
 Environmental Court Act, 2010
 Climate Change Trust Act, 2010
 Domestic Violence (Prevention and Protection) Act, 2010
 International Mother Tongue Institute Act, 2010
 Bangladesh Medical and Dental Council Act, 2010
 Balumhal and Soil Management Act, 2010
 Border Guard Bangladesh Act, 2010

2011 
 Bangabandhu Sports Welfare Foundation Act, 2011
 Plant Quarantine Act, 2011
 Public Interest Information Disclosure (Protection) Act, 2011
 Specification (Supplementary) Act, 2011
 Tax Ombudsman (Abolish) Act, 2011
 Dhaka Elevated Expressway Project (Land Acquisition) Act, 2011
 Finance Act, 2011
 Specification Act, 2011
 Vagrant and Homeless Persons (Rehabilitation) Act, 2011
 Animal Slaughter and Meat Quality Control Act, 2011
 Science and Technology Development Trust Act, 2011
 Film Parliament (Registration) Act, 2011

2012 
 Wall Writing and Posting (Control) Act, 2012
 Public Servants (Retirement) (Amendment) Act, 2012
 Prevention and Suppression of Human Trafficking Act, 2012
 Mutual Assistance Act on Crime, 2012
 Prevention of Money Laundering Act, 2012
 Dhaka Transport Coordinating Authority Act, 2012
  Pornography Control Act, 2012
 Bangladesh Agricultural Research Council Act, 2012
 Bangabandhu Poverty Alleviation and Rural Development Academy Act, 2012
 Prime Minister's Education Assistance Trust Act, 2012
 Bangladesh Applied Nutrition Research and Training Institute Act, 2012
 Bangladesh Atomic Energy Control Act, 2012
 Specification (Supplementary) Act, 2012
 Competition Act, 2012
 Product Manufacturing State Industrial Estate Workers (Terms of Service) Act, 2012 [Repealed]
 Specification Act, 2012
 Public University Teachers (Retirement) (Special Provisions) Act, 2012
 Wildlife (Conservation and Security) Act, 2012
 Disaster Management Act, 2012
 Power of Attorney Act, 2012
 Hindu Marriage Registration Act, 2012
 Value Added Tax and Supplementary Duty Act, 2012
 Sustainable and Renewable Energy Development Authority Act, 2012

2013 
 Court Contempt Act, 2013
 Waqf (Transfer and Development of Property) Special Provisions Act, 2013
 Implementation of certain ordinances issued during the period from 15th August 1975 to 9th April 1979 (Special Provisions) Act, 2013
 Implementation of certain Ordinances (Special Provisions) Act, 2013, issued from March 24, 1982 to November 11, 1986.
 Statistics Act, 2013
 Bangladesh Silk Development Board Act, 2013
 Bangladesh Water Act, 2013
 Exchanges Demutualization Act, 2013
 Bangladesh Rubber Board Act, 2013
 Specification (Supplementary) Act, 2013
 Bangladesh Film and Television Institute Act, 2013
 Children's Act, 2013
 Specification Act, 2013
 Road Maintenance Fund Board Act, 2013
 National River Protection Commission Act, 2013
 Bangla Academy Act, 2013
 Breastfeeding Alternatives, Baby Foods, Commercially Manufactured Baby Extra Feeds and Consumption Equipment (Marketing Control) Act, 2013
 Islamic Arabic University Act, 2013
 Rights and Protection of Persons with Disabilities Act, 2013
 Safe Food Act, 2013
 The Multi-Level Marketing Activities (Regulation) Act, 2013
 Bangladesh Science and Industry Research Council Act, 2013
 Bangabandhu Sheikh Mujibur Rahman Maritime University, Bangladesh Law, 2013
 Overseas Employment and Immigration Act, 2013
 Parental Maintenance Act, 2013
 Torture and Death in Custody (Prevention) Act, 2013
 Neuro-Developmental Disability Protection Trust Act, 2013
 Pigeon Port Authority Act, 2013
 Geographical Indications Products (Registration and Protection) Act, 2013
 Asian Reinsurance Corporation Act, 2013
 Grameen Bank Act, 2013
 Rural Electrification Board Act, 2013
 Brick Preparation and Lower Installation (Control) Act, 2013
 Bangladesh Travel Agency (Registration and Control) Act, 2013
 Bangladesh Weaving Board Act, 2013
 Vitamin ‘A’ Enrichment in Edible Oil Act, 2013
 Bangladesh Institute of International and Strategic Studies Act, 2013

2014 
 Specification (Supplementary) Act, 2014
 Finance Act, 2014
 Specification Act, 2014
 Bangladesh Journalist Welfare Trust Act, 2014
 Rural Savings Bank Act, 2014
 CHT Development Board Act, 2014
 Deoxyribonucleic Acid (DNA) Act, 2014
 Investment Corporation of Bangladesh Act, 2014
 Non-Formal Education Act, 2014
 Bangladesh Hotel and Restaurant Act, 2014
 Rajshahi Krishi Unnayan Bank Act, 2014

2015 
 Metrorail Act, 2015
 Bangladesh Energy and Power Research Council Act, 2015
 Formalin Control Act, 2015
 Government Vehicles (Use Control) Act, 2015
 Bangladesh Oceanographic Research Institute Act, 2015
 Youth Organization (Registration and Management) Act, 2015
 Specification (Supplementary) Act, 2015
 Finance Act, 2015
 Specification Act, 2015
 Khulna Agricultural University Act, 2015
 Export Development Bureau Act, 2015
 International Finance Corporation Act, 2015
 Financial Reporting Act, 2015
 Bangladesh Public-Private Partnership Act, 2015
 Nuclear Power Plant Act, 2015
 Development Surcharge and Levy (Imposition and Recovery) Act, 2015
 Public Servants (Marriage with Foreign Citizens) Act, 2015

2016 
 Bangladesh Tea Workers Welfare Fund Act, 2016
 Railway Safety Forces Act, 2016
 Surplus Government Employees Assimilation Act, 2016 [Repealed]
 Bangabandhu Science and Technology Fellowship Trust Act, 2016
 Asian Infrastructure Investment Bank Act, 2016
 Pigeon Port Project (Land Acquisition) Act, 2016
 Cox's Bazar Development Authority Act, 2016
 Bangladesh Petroleum Corporation Act, 2016
 Bangladesh Coast Guard Act, 2016
 Department of Defense (Sovereignty) Act, 2016
 Chittagong Medical University Act, 2016
 Rajshahi Medical University Act, 2016
 Specification (Supplementary) Act, 2016
 Finance Act, 2016
 Specification Act, 2016
 Rabindra University, Bangladesh Law, 2016
 Bangabandhu Sheikh Mujibur Rahman Digital University, Bangladesh Law, 2016
 Petroleum Act, 2016
 Youth Welfare Fund Act, 2016
 Bangladesh Bridge Authority Act, 2016
 Railway Property (Recovery of Illegal Possession) Act, 2016
 Bangladesh Investment Development Authority Act, 2016
 Tea Act, 2016
 Presidential Retirement, Rewards and Other Benefits Act, 2016
 Foreign Grants (Voluntary Activities) Regulation Act, 2016
 Bangladesh National Cadet Corps Act, 2016
 Bangabandhu National Agriculture Award Trust Act, 2016
 Bangladesh Nursing and Midwifery Council Act, 2016
 Bus Rapid Transit (BRT) Act, 2016

2017 
 Cadet College Act, 2017
 Bangladesh Biodiversity Act, 2017
 Civil Aviation Authority Act, 2017
 Bangladesh Rural Development Academy Act, 2017
 Jute Act, 2017
 Child Marriage Prohibition Act, 2017
 Bangladesh Development Research Institute Act, 2017
 Bangladesh Accreditation Council Act, 2017
 Bangladesh Shipping Corporation Act, 2017
 Bangladesh Atomic Agriculture Research Institute (BINA) Act, 2017
 Bangladesh Agricultural Research Institute (BARI) Act, 2017
 Specification (Supplementary) Act, 2017
 Finance Act, 2017
 Specification Act, 2017
 Bangladesh Jute Research Institute Act, 2017
 Bangladesh Road Transport Authority Act, 2017
 Civil Aviation Act, 2017
 Bangladesh Rice Research Institute Act, 2017
 Real Estate Acquisition and Possession Act, 2017
 Bangladesh Wheat and Maize Research Institute Act, 2017
 Bangladesh Atomic Energy Commission Act, 2017
 Bangamata Sheikh Fazilatunnesa Mujib University of Science and Technology Act, 2017

2018 
 Bangladesh College of Physicians and Surgeons Act, 2018
 Rajshahi Development Authority Act, 2018
 Groundwater Management Act for Agriculture, 2018
 Seed Act, 2018
 Power Act, 2018
 Bangladesh Ship Recycling Act, 2018
 Sheikh Hasina University Act, 2018
 One Stop Service Act, 2018
 Poet Nazrul Institute Act, 2018
 Chiefs of Defense Forces (Recruitment, Salary, Allowances and Other Benefits) Act, 2018
 Sheikh Hasina National Youth Development Institute Act, 2018
 Bangladesh Rural Development Board Act, 2018
 Buddhist Religious Welfare Trust Act, 2018
 Christian Religious Welfare Trust Act, 2018
 Gazipur Metropolitan Police Act, 2018
 Rangpur Metropolitan Police Act, 2018
 Specification (Supplementary) Act, 2018
 Finance Act, 2018
 Specification Act, 2018
 Pesticides (Pesticides) Act, 2018
 Bangladesh Industrial Establishment Nationalization Act, 2018
 Sugar (Road Development Cess) (abolish) Act, 2018
 Cantonment Act, 2018
 Weather Act, 2018
 Wage Earners Welfare Board Act, 2018
 Chittagong Development Authority Act, 2018
 Khulna Development Authority Act, 2018
 Press Institute Bangladesh (PIB) Act, 2018
 Bangladesh Agriculture Development Corporation Act, 2018
 Barind Multipurpose Development Authority Act, 2018
 Textile Act, 2018
 Sylhet Medical University Act, 2018
 Dowry Prohibition Act, 2018
 National Planning and Development Academy Act, 2018
 Hindu Welfare Trust Act, 2018
 Agricultural Marketing Act, 2018
 National Skills Development Authority Act, 2018
 Digital Security Act, 2018
 Road Transport Act, 2018
 Equivalent Payment Act, 2018
 National Sports Council Act, 2018
 Productive state-owned industrial enterprise workers (terms of service) Act, 2018
 Bangladesh Muktijoddha Welfare Trust Act, 2018
 Community Clinic Health Assistance Trust Act, 2018
 Bangladesh Livestock Research Institute Act, 2018
 Housing and Building Research Institute Act, 2018
 Weight and Measurement Standards Act, 2018
 Government Employment Act, 2018
 Bangladesh Shishu Academy Act, 2018
 Mental Health Act, 2018
 Infectious Diseases (Prevention, Control and Eradication) Act, 2018
 National Curriculum and Textbook Board Act, 2018
 Drug Control Act, 2018
 Bangladesh Public Administration Training Center Act, 2018
 Bangladesh News Agency Act, 2018
 Bangladesh Technical Education Board Act, 2018
 Bangladesh Standards and Testing Institution Act, 2018
 Fisheries Quarantine Act, 2018
 Bangladesh Fisheries Research Institute Act, 2018
 Cost and Management Accountants Act, 2018
 Bangladesh Rehabilitation Council Act, 2018

2019 
 Bangladesh EPZ Labor Act, 2019
 Bangabandhu Sheikh Mujibur Rahman Aviation and Aerospace University Act, 2019
 Plant Breed Conservation Act, 2019
 Bangladesh National Social Welfare Council Act, 2019
 Insurance Corporation Act, 2019
 Specification (Supplementary) Act, 2019
 Specification Act, 2019
 Animal Welfare Act, 2019
 Bangladesh Veterinary Council Act, 2019
 Bangladesh Sugarcrop Research Institute Act, 2019
 Bangladesh's flag-carrying ships (protection of interests) Act, 2019
 Bangladesh Industrial Technical Assistance Center (BITAC) Act, 2019

2020 
 Bangladesh Tariff Commission (Amendment) Act, 2020
 Voter List (Amendment) Act, 2020
 Bangladesh Sports Education Institutions Act, 2020
 Autonomous, Semi-Autonomous, Statutory Government Authorities, Public Non-Financial Corporations and Self-Governing Institutions.
 Bangladesh Road Transport Corporation Act, 2020
 Bangladesh Lighthouse Act, 2020
 Companies (Amendment) Act, 2020
 Specification (Supplementary) Act, 2020
 Finance Act, 2020
 Specification Act, 2020
 Information Technology Use Act by Court, 2020
 Bangladesh Bank (Amendment) Act, 2020
 Gazipur Development Authority Act, 2020
 Bangladesh Engineering Research Council Act, 2020
 Bangladesh Reference Institute for Chemical Measurements Act, 2020
 Chandpur University of Science and Technology Act, 2020
 Bangabandhu Sheikh Mujibur Rahman University, Kishoreganj Act, 2020
 Habiganj Agricultural University Act, 2020
 Marine Fisheries Act, 2020
 Fisheries and Fisheries (Inspection and Quality Control) Act, 2020
 Air Transport (Montreal Convention) Act, 2020
 Prevention of Violence against Women and Children (Amendment) Act, 2020
 Sunamganj University of Science and Technology Act, 2020
 Companies (Second Amendment) Act, 2020
 Bangladesh Energy Regulatory Commission (Amendment) Act, 2020
 Narcotics Control (Amendment) Act, 2020
 Bangladesh Madrasa Education Board Act, 2020

2021 
 Intermediate and Secondary Education (Amendment) Act, 2021
 Bangladesh Technical Education Board (Amendment) Act, 2021
 Bangladesh Madrasa Board of Education (Amendment) Act, 2021
 Bangladesh Travel Agency (Registration and Control) (Amendment) Act, 2021
 Civil Court (Amendment) Act, 2021
 Sheikh Hasina Medical University, Khulna, Law, 2021
 Specification (Supplementary) Act, 2021
 Iodized Salt Act, 2021
 Hajj and Umrah Management Act, 2021
 Child Care Center Act, 2021
 Finance Act, 2021
 Specification Act, 2021
 Bangladesh Film Artists Welfare Trust Act, 2021
 Constituency Boundary Act, 2021
 Gandhi Ashram (Board of Trustees) Act, 2021
 Bangladesh Legal Practitioners and Bar Council (Amendment) Act, 2021
 Medical College (Governing Body) (Replay) Act, 2021
 Medical Degree (Replay) Act, 2021
 Bangladesh Children's Hospitals and Institutes Act, 2021
 Kurigram Agricultural University Act, 2021
 Bangladesh National Archives Act, 2021
 Rapid increase in supply of electricity and fuel (special provisions) (Amendment) Act, 2021
 Leader of the Opposition and Deputy Leader (Prizes and Privileges) Act, 2021
 Special Security Forces Act, 2021
 Bangladesh House Building Finance Corporation (Amendment) Act, 2021
 Bangladesh Tour Operators and Tour Guides (Registration and Management) Act, 2021
 Banker's Book Evidence Act, 2021
 Highways Act, 2021
 Territorial Waters and Maritime Zones (Amendment) Act, 2021
 Judges of the Supreme Court of Bangladesh (Rewards and Privileges) Act, 2021
 Judge of the Supreme Court of Bangladesh (Travel Allowance) Act, 2021

2022 
 Chief Election Commissioner and Other Election Commissioners Appointment Act, 2022
 Bangabandhu Sheikh Mujibur Rahman University of Science and Technology, Pirojpur Act, 2022
 Bangladesh National Museum Act, 2022
 Local Government (Municipality) (Amendment) Act, 2022
 Bangladesh Patent Act, 2022
 Boiler Act, 2022
 Mongla Port Authority Act, 2022
 Chittagong Port Authority Act, 2022
 Trade Organization Act, 2022
 District Council (Amendment) Act, 2022
 Bangladesh Tourism Corporation (Amendment) Act, 2022
 The Specification (Supplement) Act, 2022
 Finance Act, 2022
 Specification Act, 2022
 National Freedom Fighters Council Act, 2022
 Private Medical Colleges and Dental Colleges Act, 2022
 Public Debt Act, 2022
 Bangladesh Atomic Energy Commission (Amendment) Act, 2022
 Bangladesh Oil, Gas and Mineral Resources Corporation Act, 2022
 Evidence (Amendment) Act, 2022
 International Center for Biodiversity Research, Bangladesh, Law, 2022

2023 
Bangladesh Supreme Court Judges (Leave, Pension and Privileges) Act, 2023
Bangladesh Public Works Commission Act, 2023
Bangladesh Nursing and Midwifery Council (Amendment) Act, 2023
Universal Pension Management Act, 2023
Zakat Fund Management Act, 2023
Bangladesh Energy Regulatory Commission (Amendment) Act, 2023
Chittagong Shahi Jame Masjid Act, 2023
Mujibnagar University, Meherpur Act, 2023
Bangabandhu Sheikh Mujibur Rahman University, Naogaon Act, 2023
Markets (Establishment and Management) Act, 2023

See also 
List of ordinances issued in Bangladesh

References 

Parliament of Bangladesh
Bangladesh-related lists
Law of Bangladesh